Shenyang Transformation International School (formerly Shenyang International School) is an international school in Dongling District, Shenyang, China. The school was established in 1998 to provide a North American, college-preparatory education from a Judeo-Christian worldview to expatriate elementary, middle, and high school students in the Shenyang, Liaoning area of Northeastern China. Originally a member of the International Schools Consortium (ISC), for nearly twenty years SYIS/STIS has served the community by providing quality Western educational opportunities for ex-pat students.

In 2017, the SYIS collaboration with ISC was dissolved, and SYIS partnered with Transformation Academy (TA), which operates schools in Shenyang and Shanghai, to form Shenyang Transformation International School (STIS).

The majority of the teaching staff are from the United States, but there are also instructors from New Zealand, South Africa, the Philippines, and China.

History
SYIS Shenyang International School was founded in 1998 by the International School of China (ISC) with the main purpose of supporting foreign families in China who wanted to give their children an international education in a multi-cultural environment. The school began with only eighteen students and three foreign teachers.

After being established in Shenyang, the school moved a few times. The school is currently situated in the New Hunnan District.

References

External links

Schools in Liaoning
Education in Shenyang
American international schools in China
1998 establishments in China
Educational institutions established in 1998